Max David Edward Holden (born 18 December 1997) is an English cricketer. He made his first-class debut on 2 April 2017 for Northamptonshire against Loughborough MCCU as part of the Marylebone Cricket Club University fixtures. Prior to his first-class debut, he was part of England's squad for the 2016 Under-19 Cricket World Cup.

He made his List A debut for Northamptonshire in the 2017 Royal London One-Day Cup on 12 May 2017. He made his Twenty20 debut for Middlesex in the 2018 t20 Blast on 6 July 2018. On 27 August 2020, in the opening match of the 2020 t20 Blast, Holden scored his first century in a T20 match, with an unbeaten 102 runs from 60 balls.

References

External links
 

1997 births
Living people
Cricketers from Cambridgeshire
English cricketers
Middlesex cricketers
Northamptonshire cricketers
Sportspeople from Cambridge